was a Japanese professional wrestling promotion operating from 2004 to 2009 and from 2010 to 2016.

History

Following the closure of Frontier Martial-Arts Wrestling in 2002, Hiromichi Fuyuki formed his own promotion, which ran under the names Fuyuki-Gun Promotion (originally used by Fuyuki for an FMW-aligned venture following his withdrawal from WAR) and World Entertainment Wrestling, and which administered the WEW titles originally created in FMW in 1999. FMW alumni such as Kintaro Kanemura, Tetsuhiro Kuroda and Go Ito maintained the promotion even after Fuyuki's death in March 2003, but stopped in May 2004.

Apache was founded by Ito and Kanemura in 2004 as a replacement of the old WEW. Their first event was on August 30, the main event was a six-man tag team match which had Ichiro Yaguchi, Riki Choshu and Tomohiro Ishii defeating BADBOY Hido, Dick Togo and Kintaro Kanemura.

The first WEW Heavyweight Champion under Apache was Togi Makabe. On August 1, 2006 Apache would hold a tournament to see which tag team would become the first WEW Tag Team Champions. In the final BADBOY Hido and Takashi Sasaki defeated Jun Kasai and Tetsuhiro Kuroda. The Winger would win Apache's first and only Death Match Tournament. Takashi Sasaki and The Winger would win the interim WEW Tag Team Title Tournament.

Apache Pro closed on June 26, 2009, after which Sasaki founded Pro Wrestling FREEDOMS. On December 27, 2010, Kanemura and Kuroda started the promotion again, this time basing it around Osaka. The promotion lasted until Christmas Day 2016, when the promotion closed a final time due to Kanemura's retirement from active competition. Tomohiko Hashimoto took over the revival of the WEW titles in his new offshoot promotion, Pro Wrestling A-Team.

Roster

Apache Army – (Kintaro Kanemura and Tetsuhiro Kuroda)

Demolition – (Tomohiko Hashimoto)

Staff

 HASEGAWA (General Manager)

 Takafumi Fujioka (Announcer)

Alumni

Jyushin Thunder Liger 
Keiji Takayama 
Mad Man Pondo 
Masada 
Masato Tanaka
Necro Butcher
Riki Choshu
Ricky Fuji
Shigeki Sato 

Shoji Akiyoshi
Taka Michinoku
Takashi Sasaki
The Winger
Apache Kosakai (Inactive) 
Kenichi Yamamoto (Inactive) 	
Rikimaru (Deceased) 
Shinjuku Shark (Inactive) 
Tomohiro Waki (Inactive) 
One Man Kru

Championships

See also

List of professional wrestling promotions in Japan

References

Japanese professional wrestling promotions
2004 establishments in Japan